Sofia Marinou (1884 – unknown) was a Greek tennis player, who won two silver medals at the 1906 Intercalated Games in Athens, Greece.

Career

At the 1906 Intercalated Games in Athens, Greece, Marinou competed in the Women's singles competition, and the Mixed doubles competition, alongside Georgios Simiriotis. In her first round singles match against Ioanna Tissamenou, Marinou and Tissamenou became the first women to represent Greece at an Olympic Games. In the mixed doubles event, Marinou and Simiriotis lost to eventual winners Max and Marie Decugis, and they were awarded a silver medal.

Marinou and Simiriotis later won the mixed doubles event at the 1908 .

Personal life
It is believed that Sofia Marinou was related to Georgios Simiriotis and his sister Esmée Simirioti.

Notes

References

External links
 Sports Reference

Greek female tennis players
Medalists at the 1906 Intercalated Games
1884 births
Year of death unknown
Tennis players at the 1906 Intercalated Games